The Waaia Football Netball Club, nicknamed the Bombers, is an Australian rules football and netball club playing in the Picola & District Football League. The club is based in the small Victorian town of Waaia, approximately 220 km from Melbourne.

History
"Waaia Football Club" can be said to have originated in 1894. Over the next couple of decades the club competed in a number of different leagues and associations.

In 1935, the club commenced an involvement in the Picola and District competition that continues to this day.  Waaia's first premiership was won in 1953.

Its 1990 premiership is folklore in the district with Mick Cleeland's 50 m torpedo goal giving the Bombers a come-from-behind victory after the final siren had sounded. Footage of the event can be viewed at http://www.picturevictoria.vic.gov.au/countryfootball/Immortality.htm
Chaos reigned following his goal as officials tried to unravel what had happened. The main issue being that the score board only showed the goals and behinds and not the total score...creating confusion as to who had won. Added to all this was irony of the goal kicker...Mick Cleeland. When then coach Mick Power took over the reins in 1988 he inherited a talented but undisciplined team that needed to learn team play. He immediately banned the use of the torpedo as it was selfish and inaccurate. Players who persisted in kicking 'torps' were benched. The most common culprit of the rule was Mick Cleeland. However, after the awards ceremony on the ground of the 1990 grand final win the team retreated to the change rooms to sing the club song whereupon Mick Power stopped everyone and yelled," I love torpedoes!"

The Bombers followed this thrill up in 1991 with an even better season where they were 1st XVIII premiers and champions as well as 2nd XVIII premiers. This was followed by the theft of the premiership cup during post game celebrations at the Waaia Hotel. The cup went missing for over a week making local and state news services. It was returned, undamaged, a fortnight later by one of the premiership players whose mates had taken it back to Melbourne as a memento of the trip. Whilst it was away the cup featured at a number of barbecues and other AFL grand final celebrations where attendees had their photo taken in the traditional styles of opposing captains shaking hands or premiership captain holding cup aloft. The 'stolen cup' story is now folklore in the town and each time the players who returned the cup visits the club he is reminded of the event.

Premierships
 Picola & District Football League (10): 1953, 1974, 1989, 1990, 1991, 1992, 1994, 1995, 2002, 2005
 Reserves: 1985, 1990, 1991, 1992, 1994

Notable players
Waaia's most famous player is Anthony Stevens who went on to captain AFL side North Melbourne, playing 292 games and winning 2 premierships. Ironically after Stevo's departure Waaia went on to have its most successful era winning 8 premierships in little over decade.
 
AFL players to have originated from Waaia are Anthony Stevens (North Melbourne), Gary Stevens (Sydney), Michael Stevens (Port Adelaide and North Melbourne) and Glen Coughlan (St.Kilda).

References

External links
 
 Gameday website

Picola & District Football League clubs
Australian rules football clubs in Victoria (Australia)
1894 establishments in Australia
Australian rules football clubs established in 1894